Ministry of Co-operatives and Poverty Alleviation is a ministry of Nepal that governs policies and programmes for tackling poverty in the country. The current minister is Ek Nath Dhakal.

References

External links 
Official website (in Hindi)

Co-operatives and Poverty Alleviation
Poverty in Nepal
2018 establishments in Nepal